Korsvollbanen is the home ground of the Norwegian sports club Korsvoll IL.

The club is in the residential neighborhood of Korsvoll in Nordre Aker, Oslo.

The stadium capacity is 2000. There are 200 seats in a small wooden stand on one side of the park. The site also has some small training pitches on the north side near the clubhouse. The club has installed an all-weather field.

Football venues in Norway
Sports venues in Oslo